Daudpur kothi is a colony in Muzaffarpur district, Bihar state, India.

Details
It is situated at the bank of river Budhi gandak and also having an ancient shiv temple. Muzaffarpur Institute of Technology (MIT) is situated near the village.

References

Villages in Muzaffarpur district